Mary O'Donoghue (born 1975) is an Irish fiction writer, poet, and translator. 

O'Donoghue grew up in County Clare, Ireland. Her debut novel Before the House Burns was published in 2010, and is described by Booker Prize-winning Irish novelist Anne Enright as "Electric, real, and utterly modern: this is a voice to welcome and to watch." Her short stories have been published in the Georgia Review, the Dublin Review, AGNI, Salamander, Literary Imagination, Stinging Fly, the Irish Times, and elsewhere. Her poetry collections are Tulle (2001) and Among These Winters (2007). She is one of the translators of Irish-language poet Seán Ó Ríordáin; Selected Poems appeared from Yale University Press (Margellos World Republic of Letters) in 2014. Across several years and bilingual volumes, she has collaborated with Louis de Paor on translations of his poetry, most recently The Brindled Cat and the Nightingale’s Tongue (Bloodaxe Books, 2014). Mary O'Donoghue's writing awards include Hennessy/Sunday Tribune New Irish Writer; two artist's fellowships from Massachusetts Cultural Council (2006 and 2012 ); Irish Times/ Legends of the Fall prize for short fiction responding to Ireland's economic crisis (2013); and residencies at Vermont Studio Center and Virginia Center for Creative Arts. She is professor of English in the Arts and Humanities division at Babson College, Massachusetts and fiction editor of AGNI. In 2023 she will hold the Heimbold Chair of Irish Studies at Villanova University.

References

1975 births
Irish writers
Irish poets
Irish women poets
Irish women writers
People from County Clare
Babson College faculty
Living people